Alexander Mikhaylovich Belostenny (February 24, 1959 – May 25, 2010) was a Ukrainian professional basketball player. He was a member of the senior Soviet national team, from 1977 to 1992, except for an absence during a single competition, EuroBasket 1987. At a height of 2.16 m (7'0 ") tall, and a weight of 120 kg (260 lbs.), he played at the center position.

Club career
Belostenny spent most of his club career at Budivelnyk from Kyiv, and was a leading player in its only Soviet Union League title in 1989. Late in his career, he played with the German club HERZOGtel Trier, where he also competed in the FIBA Korać Cup. He was a FIBA European Selection, in 1979.

National team career
As a player of the senior Soviet national team, Belostenny won three gold medals at the FIBA EuroBasket (EuroBasket 1979, EuroBasket 1981, and EuroBasket 1985), one gold medal at the 1988 Summer Olympic Games, and one bronze medal at the 1980 Summer Olympic Games. In addition, he is one of the top medalists in FIBA World Cup history, having won four medals, one gold (1982) and three silvers (1978, 1986, and 1990).

Awards and accomplishments

Clubs
FIBA European Selection: (1979)
2× USSR League Champion: (1980, 1989)
Spanish Cup Winner: (1990)

Death
Belostenny died on May 25, 2010, from lung cancer.

References

External links 

FIBA Profile
FIBA Europe Profile
 
Spanish League Profile 

1959 births
2010 deaths
Basketball players at the 1980 Summer Olympics
Basketball players at the 1988 Summer Olympics
Basketball players at the 1992 Summer Olympics
BC Budivelnyk players
Centers (basketball)
Deaths from lung cancer in Germany
FIBA EuroBasket-winning players
FIBA World Championship-winning players
Honoured Masters of Sport of the USSR
Recipients of the Order of Merit (Ukraine), 3rd class
Liga ACB players
Medalists at the 1980 Summer Olympics
Medalists at the 1988 Summer Olympics
Olympic basketball players of the Soviet Union
Olympic basketball players of the Unified Team
Olympic bronze medalists for the Soviet Union
Olympic gold medalists for the Soviet Union
Olympic medalists in basketball
PBC CSKA Moscow players
Ukrainian expatriate basketball people in Spain
Soviet expatriate basketball people in Germany
Soviet expatriate basketball people in Spain
Ukrainian expatriate sportspeople in Germany
Soviet men's basketball players
1978 FIBA World Championship players
Ukrainian men's basketball players
1982 FIBA World Championship players
1986 FIBA World Championship players
1990 FIBA World Championship players